Paul Carus (18 July 1852 – 11 February 1919) was a German-American author, editor, a student of comparative religion and philosopher.

Life and education

Carus was born in Ilsenburg, Germany, and educated at the universities of Strassburg (then Germany, now France) and Tübingen, Germany. After obtaining his PhD from Tübingen in 1876 he served in the army and then taught school. He had been raised in a pious and orthodox Protestant home, but gradually moved away from this tradition.

He left Bismarck's Imperial Germany for the United States, "because of his liberal views". After he emigrated to the USA (in 1884) he lived in Chicago, and in LaSalle, Illinois. Paul Carus married Edward C. Hegeler's daughter, engineer Mary Hegeler (Marie) and the couple later moved into the Hegeler Carus Mansion, built by her father. They had seven children, the firstborn, Robert died at birth, but Edward (b. 1890), Gustave (b. 1892), Paula (b. 1894), Elisabeth or "Libby" (b. 1896), Herman (b. 1899), and Alwin (b. 1901) all lived long lives. Mary ran the family business, Matthiessen-Hegeler Zinc Company and the Open Court business and later took on the editorial role after Carus' death, alongside their daughter Elizabeth.

Career
In the United States, Carus briefly edited a German-language journal and wrote several articles for the Index, the Free Religious Association organ.

Soon after, he became the first managing editor of the Open Court Publishing Company, founded in 1887 by his father-in-law. The goals of Open Court were to provide a forum for the discussion of philosophy, science, and religion, and to make philosophical classics widely available by making them affordable.

He also acted as the editor for two periodicals published by the company, The Open Court and The Monist.

He was introduced to Charles Sanders Peirce, the founder of American Pragmatism, by Judge Francis C. Russell of Chicago. Carus stayed abreast of Peirce's work and would eventually publish a number of his articles.

During his lifetime, Carus published 75 books and 1500 articles, mostly through Open Court Publishing Company. He wrote books and articles on history, politics, philosophy, religion, logic, mathematics, anthropology, science, and social issues of his day. In addition, Carus corresponded with many of the greatest minds of the late 19th and early 20th century, sending and receiving letters from Leo Tolstoy, Thomas Edison, Nikola Tesla, Booker T. Washington, Elizabeth Cady Stanton, Ernst Mach, Ernst Haeckel, John Dewey, and many more.

Carus's world view and philosophy
Carus considered himself a theologian rather than philosopher. He referred to himself as "an atheist who loved God".

Carus is proposed to be a pioneer in the promotion of interfaith dialogue. He explored the relationship of science and religion, and was instrumental in introducing Eastern traditions and ideas to the West. He was a key figure in the introduction of Buddhism to the West, sponsoring Buddhist translation work of D.T. Suzuki, and fostering a lifelong working friendship with Buddhist Master, Soyen Shaku. Carus' interest in Asian religions seems to have intensified after he attended the World's Parliament of Religions (in 1893).

For years afterwards, Carus was a strong sympathizer of Buddhist ideas, but stopped short of committing fully to this, or any other, religion. Instead, he ceaselessly promoted his own rational concept which he called the "Religion of Science." Carus had a selective approach and he believed that religions evolve over time. After a battle for survival, he expected a "cosmic religion of universal truth" to emerge from the ashes of traditional beliefs.

Carus proposed his own philosophy similar to panpsychism known as 'panbiotism', which he defined as "everything is fraught with life; it contains life; it has the ability to live."

Religion of Science
Carus was a follower of Benedictus de Spinoza; he was of the opinion that Western thought had fallen into error early in its development in accepting the distinctions between body and mind and the material and the spiritual. (Kant's phenomenal and noumenal realms of knowledge; Christianity's views of the soul and the body, and the natural and the supernatural). Carus rejected such dualisms, and wanted science to reestablish the unity of knowledge. The philosophical result he labeled Monism.

His version of monism is more closely associated with a kind of pantheism, although it was occasionally identified with positivism. He regarded every law of nature as a part of God's being. Carus held that God was the name for a cosmic order comprising "all that which is the bread of our spiritual life." He held the concept of a personal God as untenable. He acknowledged Jesus Christ as a redeemer, but not as the only one, for he believed that other religious founders were equally endowed with similar qualities.

His beliefs attempted to steer a middle course between idealistic metaphysics and materialism. He differed with metaphysicians because they "reified" words and treated them as if they were realities, and he objected to materialism because it ignored or overlooked the importance of form. Carus emphasized form by conceiving of the divinity as a cosmic order. He objected to any monism which sought the unity of the world, not in the unity of truth, but in the oneness of a logical assumption of ideas. He referred to such concepts as henism, not monism.

Carus held that truth was independent of time, human desire, and human action. Therefore, science was not a human invention, but a human revelation which needed to be apprehended; discovery meant apprehension; it was the result or manifestation of the cosmic order in which all truths were ultimately harmonious.

Criticisms of Carus' ideas
It is claimed that Carus was dismissed by Orientalists and philosophers alike because of his failure to comply with the rules of either discipline.

Legacy
The legacy of Paul Carus is honored through the efforts of the Hegeler Carus Foundation, the Carus Lectures at the American Philosophical Association (APA), and the Paul Carus Award for Interreligious Understanding by the Council for a Parliament of the World's Religions (CPWR). Mary Hegeler Carus and their daughter Elizabeth Carus took on the editorial role after Carus' death.

Bibliography
His publications include:  
 The Open Court Fortnightly Journal Vol 1 1887-1888
 The Soul of Man: An Investigation of the Facts of Physiological And Experimental Psychology (1891, republished 2006) 
 Monism: Its Scope and Import (1891)
 Homilies of Science (The Open Court Publishing Co., 1892)
 The Religion of Science (1893, republished 2007) 
 Truth in fiction: twelve tales with a moral 1893
 The Philosophy of the Tool 1893
 The Gospel of Buddha (1894) 
 Buddhism and Its Christian Critics (1894, republished 2005) ; 1905, new & revised edition
 The History of the Devil and the Idea of Evil (1900) 
 Eros and Psyche: A fairy-tale of ancient Greece, retold after Apuleius (1900)
 Fundamental problems; the method of philosophy as a systematic arrangement of knowledge 1903
 The Surd of Metaphysics (1903)
 The Nature of the State 1904
 Kant and Spencer; a study of the fallacies of agnosticism 1904
 Karma: A Story of Buddhist Ethics (1903, republished 2004) 
 Primer of philosophy 1906
 Story of Samson and its Place in the Religious Development of Mankind (1907, republished 2003) 
 [https://archive.org/details/TheBrideOfChrist The Bride Of Christ: A Study In Christian Legend Lore] (1908)
 The Foundations of Mathematics (1908, republished 2004) 
 GOD: An Enquiry into the Nature of Man's Highest Ideal and a Solution of the Problem from the Standpoint of Science (1908, republished 2007) 
 The Philosopher's Martyrdom; A Satire 1908
 Godward; a record of religious progress 1908
 The Pleroma: An Essay on the Origin of Christianity (1909)
 Philosophy as a Science: A Synopsis of the Writings of Paul Carus (1909)
 The Philosophy of Form  (1911, republished 2007) 
 The Mechanistic Principle and the Non-Mechanical: An Inquiry into Fundamentals With Extracts from Representatives of Either Side (1913) 
 The Principle of Relativity In the Light of the Philosophy of Science (1913, republished 2004) 
 Nietzsche and Other Exponents of Individualism (1914, republished 2007) 
 Goethe, with special consideration of his philosophy, by Paul Carus 1915
 Kant's Prolegomena (1902, republished 1947)
 The Rise of Man: A Sketch of the Origin of the Human Race  (republished 2004)
 The Ethical Problem 1899 (republished 2005)

See also
 American philosophy
 List of American philosophers
 Necessitarianism
 Pleroma

References

External links

 The Monist
 Hegeler Carus Foundation
 Carus Lectures
 Council for a Parliament of the World's Religions (CPWR)
 Paul Carus Award for Interreligious Understanding
 
 
 

1852 births
1919 deaths
People from Ilsenburg
People from the Province of Saxony
German emigrants to the United States
American philosophers
American publishers (people)
American theologians
American Buddhist studies scholars
German scholars of Buddhism
American male non-fiction writers
19th-century American translators
19th-century male writers
Panpsychism
19th-century American businesspeople